Robert Gourlay (24 July 1904 – 1951) was a Scottish cricketer. He played first-class cricket for Bengal and Europeans.

See also
 List of Bengal cricketers

References

External links
 

1904 births
1951 deaths
Scottish cricketers
Bengal cricketers
Europeans cricketers
Sportspeople from Dumfries